is a railway station in the city of Nikkō, Tochigi, Japan, operated by the private railway operator Tōbu Railway. The station is numbered "TN-54".

Lines

Station layout
The station consists of one island platform connected to the station building by a footbridge.

Platforms

Adjacent stations

History
It was renamed Kosagoe on 6 July 1930.

From 17 March 2012, station numbering was introduced on all Tōbu lines, with Kosagoe Station becoming "TN-54".

The platform received protection by the national government as a Registered Tangible Cultural Property in 2017.

Passenger statistics
In fiscal 2019, the station was used by an average of 215 passengers daily (boarding passengers only).

Surrounding area
 Kinugawa River
 Kinugawa Onsen hot spring area
 Kawaji Onsen hot spring area
 Tobu World Square theme park

See also
 List of railway stations in Japan

References

External links

  

Railway stations in Tochigi Prefecture
Stations of Tobu Railway
Railway stations in Japan opened in 1924
Tobu Kinugawa Line
Nikkō, Tochigi
Registered Tangible Cultural Properties